Wisconsin wine refers to wine made from grapes grown in the U.S. state of Wisconsin. Wisconsin is part of the largest American Viticultural Area (AVA), the Upper Mississippi Valley AVA, which includes southwest Wisconsin, southeast Minnesota, northeast Iowa, and northwest Illinois. The state also has two smaller designated American Viticultural Areas, the Lake Wisconsin AVA and the Wisconsin Ledge AVA.

The Wisconsin Winery Association is a statewide organization that promotes wine making in the state.

History
The first wine grapes were planted in Wisconsin by Agoston Haraszthy in the mid-19th century. Before he migrated to California and helped to found the wine industry there, he established a vineyard, winery and wine cellars overlooking the Wisconsin River at what is today the Wollersheim Winery near Prairie du Sac. Although Haraszthy found the climate of Wisconsin difficult for wine grape production, later German settlers produced wine using both European and native American grape varieties.

The first modern winery in Wisconsin, the von Stiehl Winery in Algoma, opened in 1967.
Today over 110 wineries have commercial operations in Wisconsin, with most making wines from other fruits in addition to grapes. Some Wisconsin wineries rely upon vineyards in other states for all or part of their grape sources.

The first annual professional wine competition in Wisconsin was held at the Wisconsin State Fair in 2011.

See also
American wine
Wisconsin Ledge AVA
Upper Mississippi Valley AVA

References

External links
Wisconsin Winery Association official website

 
Wine regions of the United States by state